The 1960 Mitropa Cup was the 20th season of the Mitropa football club tournament. It was contested as a competition between countries and there was no elimination. The five competing countries each sent six teams each to the competition, which was won by Hungary.

Matches
Matches played in July 1960.

|}

Final standings

References

External links
Mitropa Cup 1960 at Rec.Sport.Soccer Statistics Foundation

1960
1960–61 in European football
1960–61 in Hungarian football
1960–61 in Yugoslav football
1960–61 in Austrian football
1960–61 in Czechoslovak football
1960–61 in Italian football